Carlisle-Rockledge is a census-designated place in Etowah County, Alabama, United States. The CDP includes the communities of Carlisle and Rockledge, both of which are located along U.S. Route 431 in northwest Etowah County. Its population was 2,137 as of the 2010 census.

Demographics

References

Census-designated places in Etowah County, Alabama
Census-designated places in Alabama